Ferenc Rabár (4 June 1929 – 29 December 1999) was a Hungarian politician, who served as Minister of Finance in 1990.

References
 Rulers.org
 Meghalt Rabár Ferenc

1929 births
1999 deaths
Finance ministers of Hungary
20th-century Hungarian economists